Harold Dade (March 24, 1923 in Chicago, IL – July 17, 1962) was an American professional boxer in the Bantamweight division who held the World Bantamweight championship.

Amateur career
Won the 1940 Chicago Golden Gloves Championship in the flyweight (112 lb) division by decision over Gene Evans. Dropped a decision for the (112 lb) Intercity Championship to Demetrio Carabella.
Won the 1941 Chicago Golden Gloves Tournament of Champions in the flyweight (112 lb) division by decision over Paul Carbetta. He was on the short end of an unpopular decision at the Intercity matches in the same year against Diogenes Leon.
Runner up in the 1941 National AAU Championship in Boston, in the Flyweight Class. Dade defeated Tony Peppi of Boston in the semi-finals, before losing the final to Lawrence Torpy of Philadelphia.

Pro career
Dade turned pro in 1942 and captured the World Bantamweight championship in 1947 with a win over Manuel Ortiz.

Professional boxing record

See also
List of world bantamweight boxing champions

References

External links
 
 Harold Dade - CBZ Profile

1923 births
1962 deaths
Boxers from Chicago
Flyweight boxers
World bantamweight boxing champions
American male boxers